Talmei Yechiel (lit. Yechiel Furrows) is a moshav in central Israel. Located near Kiryat Malachi, it falls under the jurisdiction of Be'er Tuvia Regional Council.

History
The moshav was founded in 1949 by Jewish immigrants from Bulgaria and Romania on land that had belonged to the depopulated Palestinian village of Yasur. It was named after Yechiel Chelnov, a Russian Zionist leader.

References

External links
Official website 

Moshavim
Populated places established in 1949
Populated places in Southern District (Israel)
1949 establishments in Israel
Bulgarian-Jewish culture in Israel
Romanian-Jewish culture in Israel